Cambridge Tower is a building in Austin, Texas, United States, that opened in 1965 as a luxury apartment tower.  The building was designed by Dallas-based architect Thomas E. Stanley, and contains numerous New Formalism architectural elements including balconies adorned with brise soleil columns and ornamental breeze blocks. The building currently operates as a condominium. It was listed on the National Register of Historic Places on June 20, 2018.

See also
National Register of Historic Places listings in Travis County, Texas

References

External links

Residential buildings in Austin, Texas
Residential buildings completed in 1965
National Register of Historic Places in Austin, Texas
Residential buildings on the National Register of Historic Places in Texas